Udasi (Gurmukhi: ਉਦਾਸੀ ਸੰਪਰਦਾ; udāsī saparadā) is a religious sect of ascetic sadhus centred in northern India. Becoming custodians of Sikh shrines in the 18th century, they were notable interpreters and spreaders of the Sikh philosophy during that time. However, their religious practices border on a syncretism of Sikhism and Hinduism, including idolatry, and they did not conform to the Khalsa standards as ordained by Guru Gobind Singh. When the Lahore Singh Sabha reformers, dominated by Tat Khalsa Sikhs, would hold them responsible for indulging in ritual practices antithetical to Sikhism, as well as personal vices and corruption, the Udasi mahants were expelled from the Sikh shrines.

Etymology 
Udasi is derived from the Sanskrit word Udāsīn, which means one who is indifferent to or disregardful of worldly attachments, a stoic, or a mendicant.

History 

According to myth, the sect was established in the Puranic age but historically-speaking, the sect was founded by and based on the teachings of Guru Nanak's elder son Sri Chand (1494–1629, other sources give a death year of 1643). Sri Chand, contrary to his father's emphasis on participation in society, propagated ascetic renunciation and celibacy. Another Sikh tradition links the Udasis to Baba Gurditta, the eldest son of Guru Hargobind, and there is dispute on whether the Udasis originated with Sri Chand or Gurditta. Another viewpoint is that Sri Chand was the founder of the sect and passed the leadership to Baba Gurditta as his successor.

They maintain their own parallel line of gurus from Guru Nanak, followed by Sri Chand, followed by Gurditta. They first came to prominence in the 17th century, and gradually began to manage Sikh shrines and establishments in the 18th century, from where they espoused a model of Sikhism that diverged considerably from that of the Khalsa. They would set up establishments across North India through to Benares, where they would come to be ideologically joined with monastic asceticism. The combination of Hindu gods and the Sikh religious text indicated that the sect evolved over time under many historical influences and conditions,  interpreting the message of Guru Granth Sahib in monistic Vedantic terms. They were initially largely based in urban centers where they set up their establishments, or akharas, only beginning to spread into rural areas during Sikh rule; before, they had around a dozen centres; by the end of Maharaja Ranjit Singh's reign, the number had increased to around 250. The Udasis widely propagated its form of Sikh philosophy, and during the 18th and the early 19th centuries, their teachings attracted a large number of people to the Sikh fold.

Before the emergence of the Singh Sabha Movement in the late 19th century, they controlled important Sikh shrines, including the Harimandir Sahib for a short while. However, during the Akali movement of the 20th century, the Tat Khalsa Sikhs expelled them from the Sikh shrines, accusing them of vices and of indulging in ritual practices that were against the teachings of the Sikh gurus. The Sikh Gurdwara Reform Act, 1925 defined the term "Sikh" in a way that excluded the syncretic groups like Udasis, Nanakpanthis, and other groups who maintained transitional identities. Subsequently, the Udasis increasingly identified themselves as Hindus rather than Sikhs.

Practices 
According to 18th-century descriptions, they either cut or matted their hair under a turban, rather than knot it under a turban like Khalsas, and instead of the Khalsa emphasis on the panj kakkar garb and sporting arms, their dress code would include items such as a cap, a cotton bag, a flower rosary, a vessel made of dried pumpkin, a chain around the waist, ash to smear on their body, and a deerskin upon which to perform Hatha yoga, resulting in an extremely divergent appearance from Khalsa Sikhs in the eighteenth century. In addition to not consider the Khalsa's Rehat Maryada to be binding on them, their modes of thought and attitude towards salvation also differed significantly. The Khalsa believed that salvation could be attained while taking part in society and pursuing secular objectives like political power and accumulation of resources like agrarian land, though this had to be accomplished within a particular framework of beliefs and spiritual practices, chief among which was the societal order and structure of the Khalsa. The Udasis considered secular pursuits to be incompatible with personal salvation, which was to be achieved only through renouncing the world, espousing asceticism and a monastic traveler lifestyle. Udasis are known for their Akharas along with the Nirmala sect of Sikhism.

The Udasis also worship the panchayatana, the five Hindu deities: Shiva, Vishnu, Durga, Ganesha, and Surya.

Factions 
There are various sub-sects within the Udasis, some of them being:

 Almast dhūāṅ
 Phūl dhūāṅ
 Goind (or Gondā) dhūāṅ
 Bālū Husnā dhūāṅ
 Nāngā, followers of this sect remain naked except for a brass chain worn around the waist

Note - the word dhūāṅ means hearth

Bakhshishāṅ sects 

After the four dhūāṅs, another sub-sect of Udasis emerged known as Bakhshishāṅ. There were six prominent groups of this type, them namely being:

 Bhagat Bhagvanie (followers of Bhagat Bhagvan)
 Suthrashahie (followers of Suthrashah)
 Sangat Sahibie (followers of Sangat Sahib)
 Mihan Shahie or Mihall Dasie, so called after Mihan, the title conferred by Guru Tegh Bahadur on Ramdev
 Bakht Mallie (followers of Bakht Mall)
 Jit Mallie (followers of Jit Mall)

Akhara locations 

Traditionally, there were four Udasi centres (akharas or dhuans) with each controlling a certain preaching area; Nanakmatta, Kashmir, Malwa (Punjab) and Doaba. There is an Udasi gurudwara (temple) in Amritsar, near the Harimandir Sahib (Golden Temple).

Today's Udasi are predominantly located in northwestern India especially around Punjab Haryana, Gujarat and cities like Haridwar and New Delhi; they are divided into three major groups:

 Niya (New) Udasi Panchayati Akarda
 Bara (Big) Udasi Panchayati Akarda
 Nirmal Udasi Panachayati Akarda

Leaders

See also
 Dhanadeva – an ancient inscription found in an Udasi shrine
 Sects of Sikhism
 Sects of Hinduism
 Sadh Belo

References

External links
 Udasis

Sikh groups and sects
Asceticism